Baeacris bogotensis is a species of spur-throated grasshopper in the family Acrididae. It is found in Colombia and Ecuador.

References

External links

 

Melanoplinae
Orthoptera of South America
Insects described in 1973